HMS Valiant was one of five s built for the Royal Navy during the early 1910s. She participated in the Battle of Jutland during the First World War as part of the Grand Fleet. Other than that battle, and the inconclusive Action of 19 August, her service during the war generally consisted of routine patrols and training in the North Sea. She saw further action during the Second World War in the Mediterranean and Far East.

Design and description 
The Queen Elizabeth-class ships were designed to form a fast squadron for the fleet that was intended to operate against the leading ships of the opposing battleline. This required maximum offensive power and a speed several knots faster than any other battleship to allow them to defeat any type of ship.

Ship measures and propulsion 
She was powered by two sets of Brown-Curtis steam turbines, each driving two shafts using steam from 24 Babcock & Wilcox boilers. Her crew numbered 919 officers and ratings in 1915 and 1,218 in 1919.

Armament, sensors and fire control 
The Queen Elizabeth class was equipped with eight breech-loading (BL)  Mk I guns in four twin-gun turrets, in two superfiring pairs fore and aft of the superstructure, designated 'A', 'B', 'X', and 'Y' from front to rear. Twelve of the fourteen BL  Mk XII guns were mounted in casemates along the broadside of the vessel amidships; the remaining pair were mounted on the forecastle deck near the aft funnel and were protected by gun shields. The anti-aircraft (AA) armament were composed of two quick-firing (QF)  20 cwt Mk I guns. The ships were fitted with four submerged 21-inch (533 mm) torpedo tubes, two on each broadside.

Valiant was completed with two fire-control directors fitted with  rangefinders. One was mounted above the conning tower, protected by an armoured hood, and the other was in the spotting top above the tripod mast. Each turret was also fitted with a 15-foot rangefinder. The main armament could be controlled by 'B' turret as well. The secondary armament was primarily controlled by directors mounted on each side of the compass platform on the foremast once they were fitted in July 1917.

Armour 
The main conning tower was protected by 13 inches of armour. After the Battle of Jutland, 1 inch of high-tensile steel was added to the main deck over the magazines and additional anti-flash equipment was added in the magazines.

The ship was fitted with flying-off platforms mounted on the roofs of 'B' and 'X' turrets in 1918, from which fighters and reconnaissance aircraft could launch. During her 1929–1930 refit, the platform was removed from 'X' turret and a folding Type EIH catapult was installed on the quarterdeck, along with a crane to recover a floatplane. The platform atop 'B' turret, the catapult and its crane were removed when Valiant was reconstructed in 1937–1939.

Modifications 
The two funnels were trunked into one and a single octuple 2-pounder mountings was added. Two of the torpedo tubes were removed, and the aircraft platforms were replaced by a single catapult. These modifications brought the maximum displacement up to 35,970 tons. In 1936 a second octuple 2 pdr mounting was added.
Between March 1937 and November 1939 she underwent a complete rebuild at Devonport. Fuel load was 3,393 tons oil, and maximum speed was reduced to  despite the increase in power, due to the increase in displacement and draught. The secondary armament was changed to 20 ×  Mk I dual purpose guns in 10 twin mountings and the close range anti-aircraft armament consisted of four octuple 2 pdr "pom pom" mountings. The ship's fire control was modernised to include the HACS MkIV AA fire control system and the Admiralty Fire Control Table Mk VII for surface fire control of the main armament.

Construction and career
HMS Valiant  was laid down at the Fairfield Shipbuilding and Engineering Company, Govan on 31 January 1913, launched on 4 November 1914 and commissioned on 19 February 1916 under the command of Captain Maurice Woollcombe for service in the Grand Fleet.

First World War
Upon completion on 19 February 1916, under Captain Maurice Woollcombe, Valiant joined the recently formed Fifth Battle Squadron of the Grand Fleet. In an attempt to lure part of the Grand Fleet out of its ports and destroy it, the German High Seas Fleet, consisting of 16 battleships, 6 battle cruisers, and other ships, left Wilhelmshaven early on the morning of 31 May. The plan called for Hipper to leave Wilhelmshaven with the battlecruisers of the 1st and the light cruisers of the 2nd Reconnaissance Group and push north out of sight of the Danish coast. There he was to provoke a departure of British ships by attacking coastal towns and lure them toward the High Seas Fleet The intelligence Division of the British Admiralty Room 40 had intercepted and decoded German radio traffic containing operational plans. As a result, the Admiralty ordered Jellicoe and Beatty to sail that night with the Grand Fleet from Scapa Flow, Cromarty, and Rosyth to cut off and destroy the High Seas Fleet.
After the 5th Battle Squadron departed Rosyth that morning, Beatty ordered a course change to the northeast at 2:15 p.m. to join up with Grand Fleet. At 2:20, Hipper's battlecruisers spotted Beatty's battlecruiser. At 2:32, Beatty ordered a course change to the east-southeast to cut off the Germans' line of retreat. Hipper ordered his ships to turn to starboard and set a southeasterly course. With this turn, Hipper fell back to the High Seas Fleet, which was  behind him. Beatty then also changed course to the east to catch up with Hipper.
By 3:05, the 5th Battle Squadron had reached a distance to attack the German light cruisers. By 3:08, the 5th Battle Squadron had reached the rear of the German battlecruisers and Valiant opened fire on the SMS Moltke which received one hit. The situation changed when the German battleships came into view at 3:40. Since Beatty had failed to sufficiently signal his intentions when he turned north, the battleships of the 5th Battle Squadron were on an opposite course past the battlecruisers and headed directly for the approaching main body of the High Seas Fleet. At 3:48 Scheer opened fire on the British battleships. Valiant managed to avoid hits and in turn fired on three German ships from a distance of 14 to 16 kilometers at 4:30. Valiant continued to participate in the battle until the enemy came out of sight at a distance of 17 kilometers at about 5:02.

Inter-war period
From 1919 to the end of 1924 Valiant was part of the 1st Battle Squadron, Atlantic Fleet after which she was with the 1st Battle Squadron of the Mediterranean Fleet until March 1929. On 2 December 1930 she was recommissioned for service in the Atlantic where in 1931 her crew participated in the Invergordon Mutiny.  March 1932 saw her transferred to the Home Fleet until in July 1935 she was once again in the Mediterranean.

World War II
On 30 November 1939 Valiant was commissioned at Devonport and assigned to the America and West Indies Station.
Returning to Britain in December 1939, she escorted Canadian troops across the Atlantic and joined Home Fleet on 7 January 1940.  Valiant engaged in escort duty for troop transports and in May 1940 supported the British landing forces in the Norwegian campaign. While there, the battleship narrowly escaped a torpedo fired by U 38.

Mers-el-Kébir 

With the surrender of France on 22 June 1940, the bulk of the French fleet lay at Mers-el-Kébir. Since British Prime Minister Winston Churchill was very worried that the French ships might fall into the hands of the Germans and did not believe the Vichy government's assurances that it would prevent the Germans from seizing the ships, he intended to give the French an ultimatum. On Wednesday, 3 July 1940, Force H under the command of Vice Admiral James Fownes Somerville consisting of the aircraft carrier Ark Royal, the battlecruiser Hood, the battleships Valiant, Resolution, and Nelson, and other cruisers and destroyers appeared off the harbor entrance. Somerville radioed Admiral Marcel Gensoul to inform him of the British demands. After the ultimatum expired, the Valiant opened fire along with the Hood and Resolution. The Dunkerque the Provence and the Brittany were hit and heavily damaged the latter exploded and sank. After Somerville had ceased fire to give Gensoul another chance, he overlooked that the Strasbourg together with the five remaining destroyers had escaped into the open sea behind the thick smoke of the explosions. The Strasbourg, along with the destroyers Volta, Tigre and Le Terrible, reached Toulon on the evening of 4 July.
In September, she joined the carrier HMS Illustrious with the squadron at Alexandria. For the remainder of the year, she sailed security duties in the Mediterranean, primarily on fleet advances. On the night of 18–19 December, together with the Warspite, she shelled the Albanian port of Valona

Cape Matapan 

 
With the help of an intercepted Luftwaffe radio message decoded by ULTRA, Admiral Cunningham learned that the Italians, under the command of Vice-Admiral Angelo Iachino, intended to attack the British fleet to distract them from transporting German troops to North Africa. After the Italians sortied in a convoy of 22 ships, including the battleship Vittorio Veneto, on 26 March, Cunningham brought all the ships into position, including the Barham. Cunningham then ordered an air attack. Multiple air strikes by Formidables Fairey Swordfish torpedo bombers damaged the Vittorio Veneto and crippled the heavy cruiser  The Vittorio Veneto escaped westwards as darkness fell. 
Later that evening. Admiral Iachino, ordered the two other heavy cruisers of the 1st Division to render assistance to Pola in the darkness. The Italian ships and the British arrived almost simultaneously at Polas location, but the Italians had almost no clue that the British were nearby. On the other hand, the British knew exactly where the Italians were, thanks to their radar-equipped ships.

Battle of Crete
In May 1941 Valiant operated off Crete, and was struck by two bombs.

Mining at Alexandria
On 19 December 1941, Valiant was seriously damaged by limpet mines placed by Italian frogmen of Decima Flottiglia MAS, who entered Alexandria harbor riding two-man "human torpedoes" ("maiali"). Her sister ship  was also damaged. Lieutenant Durand de la Penne  placed the mines on Valiant. The other two teams attached their mines and escaped, but de la Penne's maiale broke down. De la Penne pushed the maiale under Valiant and left it on the bottom. Then he and his companion Corporal Emilio Bianchi emerged and were captured. They were interrogated by Captain Charles Morgan, but told him nothing. A few minutes before the mines were scheduled to detonate, when it was too late to find and deactivate them, he informed Morgan of their existence (but not their location) to allow the crew on board to evacuate. They were kept in the locked compartment, which was (unbeknownst to them or Morgan) just above where the mine would explode. Both were injured by the explosion, but survived.
The mine attached to Valiant was not actually in contact with her hull, so the damage was far less severe than to Queen Elizabeth. Despite having a heavy trim forward, her decks were above water, and she remained clear of the harbour bottom. Although nearly immobilised she was able, although only for a few days, to give the impression of full battle readiness, at least until she could be repaired. Valiant was repaired in Durban, South Africa, carrying out post-refit trials in July 1942, and took part in exercises with the Eastern Fleet the following month. At the end of August, Valiant took part in Operation Touchstone, an exercise to test East Africa's defences against a seaborne invasion and to conduct a dress rehearsal for Operation Ironclad, the invasion of French Madagascar. She remained in African waters until the end of the year, and returned to Devonport for a refit in January 1943.

Sicily and Italy 

 
On 17 June, Valiant departed Scapa Flow for Gibraltar along with the Nelson,  Rodney and  Warspite, joining Force H on arrival. Between 2 and 3 September, Valiant and Warspite covered the attack across the Strait of Messina and bombed the Italian coastal batteries at Reggio. She returned home for overhaul in October 1943. Upon completion on 1 December,  Valiant was detached to the Eastern Fleet.

Drydock accident in Ceylon
In 1944, Valiant was sent to the Far East to join the Eastern Fleet. There she took part in raids against Japanese bases in Indonesia. On 8 August 1944, she was severely damaged in an accident with the floating drydock at Trincomalee, Ceylon. The drydock was being raised with Valiant in it by pumping water from ballast tanks. The tanks were emptied in the wrong sequence for Valiants weight distribution, which was exacerbated by her full munitions load. As a result, the drydock was over-stressed at its ends, broke its back and sank. Valiants two inner screws were jammed as well as one of her rudders. Valiant had remained in steam and was able to avoid worse damage or sinking. After the incident, the responsible Naval Constructor was disciplined.

Fate 
It was decided to sail Valiant to Alexandria, where there were suitable docking facilities. She got as far as Suez Bay, but could not attempt the Suez Canal in that condition. Lt Cmdr Peter Keeble, an experienced diver and salvage expert, personally supervised the removal of her two inner screw shafts near the gland. The A-brackets holding the shafts and screws were also cut, dropping both screws and shafts to the bottom. Keeble had perfected available underwater cutting torches by combining British and Italian technology to cut away the thick propeller shafts. She returned to the UK and was decommissioned in July 1945. Valiant formed part of the Imperieuse stoker mechanics' training establishment at Devonport for the rest of her career. She was sold for scrap on 19 March 1948, and left Devonport for the breakers of Arnott Young at Cairnryan on 11 August of that year.

Notes

References

Citations

Bibliography

External links

 Page on the ship at battleships-cruisers.co.uk
 Maritimequest HMS Valiant Photo Gallery
 HMS Valiant at navalhistories
Battle of Jutland Crew Lists Project - HMS Valiant Crew List

Queen Elizabeth-class battleships
Ships built on the River Clyde
1914 ships
World War I battleships of the United Kingdom
World War II battleships of the United Kingdom